Cholmondeley Islet  is a small island in the Boydong cays Shelburne Bay in far north Queensland, Australia about 105 km north of Cape Grenville, Cape York Peninsula in the Great Barrier Reef Marine Park Queensland, Australia.

It is a part of the East Islands group about 30 km northeast of Captain Billy Landing.

See also

 List of islands of Australia

References 

Islands on the Great Barrier Reef
Uninhabited islands of Australia
Islands of Far North Queensland
Great Barrier Reef Marine Park